The South African Weather Service (SAWS) is the meteorological service under the South African government's Department of Environmental Affairs and Tourism.  SAWS is a member of the World Meteorological Organization.

Under the South African Weather Service Act (No. 8 of 2001) effective 15 July 2001, SAWS became a public entity.

Data acquisition

Weather stations 
South Africa operates a significant number of weather stations in South Africa as well as stations at Gough Island, Marion Island and Antarctica in cooperation with the South African National Antarctic Programme.

Weather radar 
Near real-time (~5 minutes delay) weather radar is available for most of the country, even within the Kruger National Park.

Marine weather buoys 
Between 30 and 40 drifting weather buoys are deployed annually.

Weather modification 
The SAWS, in cooperation with a number of other entities, is actively involved in weather control research under the South African National Precipitation Research and Rainfall Enhancement Programme, specifically with the Bethlehem Precipitation Research Project

See also 
 South African National Antarctic Programme
 World Meteorological Organization

References

External links 
 
 Near real-time weather radar

South African Weather Service